The Cheese Grater is a student satirical and investigative magazine produced at University College London by a society of UCL Union, a students' union. It was first published in March 2004, and was named London's best student publication in the 2022 Student Publication Association awards.

The contents are a mix of (student) political news stories, exclusive investigations and humorous items, particularly cartoons. It most often concerns itself with activities of UCL Union, of which its writers are generally strongly critical.

Origins
The Cheese Grater was formed when "René Lavanchy", then a first-year student at UCL, decided to found a new magazine to plug what he saw as a gap in the provision of student media at the college, specifically as UCL Union regulations prevented the publication of most serious criticism of the Union at that time. Dissatisfied with the tone, content and production values of Pi Magazine, the only significant student publication at the time, he resolved to edit a new magazine himself and publish it on the cheap. Having approached a fellow halls resident, he secured him as treasurer and applied for the magazine to be affiliated as a society of UCL Union, so that it could publicise through the Union and use a UCL e-mail address. The society was affiliated on 12 February 2004.

The first issue came out on 25 March 2004. It was photocopied - badly - onto 7 out of 8 A4 pages, the last being blank, and the page numbers were handwritten on the original. Publication continues to be done by hand on public photocopying machines without any binding. The first issue struck the keynote of The Cheese Graters tone with a spoof article purporting to be the script of The Passion of Rick Jones, a film based on The Passion of The Christ but transferring the scene to UCL Union's annual general meeting.

In 2016, The Cheese Grater launched a sister publication, Grater Expectations; an irregularly published zine with a feminist slant and focusing on absurdist humour and art.

Notable articles
The Cheese Graters second issue came out in October 2004 and included an article on the controversy between Ted Honderich and the newspaper London Student.

After London Student ran an issue (20 September 2004) with the front-page headline 'Racial Harm-ony' and the headline 'Honder-Sick' on page 2, in which it accused the UCL emeritus professor of philosophy of damaging race relations at the University of London, Honderich's lawyers wrote to the paper and demanded a right of reply, citing inaccuracies. The reply was duly published. Shortly afterwards came The Cheese Graters account of the events, including a reproduction of part of the lawyers' letter. The article accused the London Student journalists of bad journalism and Honderich of overreacting. Although the then London Student editor took exception to the article, neither he nor anyone else has shown there was anything inaccurate in it. This was the first article to carry The Cheese Graters "special report" banner.

The lashing out against UCL Union institutions which characterises The Cheese Grater only really got going in February 2005, with another special report accusing then UCL Union sabbatical officer David Renton of laziness, incompetence and general neglect of his duties. Although the article was qualified in its condemnation (the editor regrets that it was not more assertive) the level and detail of criticism was unprecedented in recent student discourse, and the subject was reportedly shocked.

Since then, The Cheese Grater has continued to espouse particular causes and criticise what it sees as failing institutions and people. It condemned UCL Union's executive in February 2005 for failing to stand up to the National Union of Students; it has criticised the union's awards process (Social Colours) and elections procedures; and it has attacked other media, including UCL News (a UCL newsletter, no longer printed) but mainly Pi Magazine, on the grounds that it is bland, unoriginal, has no strong editorial controls, is badly written, full of spelling mistakes, frequently inaccurate, appallingly badly designed and a hub for reactionary forces in student politics. In March 2006 the magazine revealed – using the evidence of a leaked e-mail – that then student editor of Pi Magazine Simon Dedman had cheated in recent UCL Union elections, securing the election of Nick Barnard as Media and Communications Officer, and that neither person had been significantly disciplined for it.

The magazine has also covered issues of student welfare. In December 2005 it published a story detailing failings around the construction of UCL's new Anthropology building, which caused noise and dust pollution as well as severely disrupting the studies of students in neighbouring departments. In October 2008, another investigation revealed that UCL had failed to remove large quantities of asbestos from its premises, some of which were exposed and left in areas used by students and staff.

Since Autumn 2005, a series of articles have appeared under the heading 'UCL plc', written under the pseudonym 'Mr Chatterbox' (a reference to Evelyn Waugh's novel Vile Bodies). The articles were a series of attacks on UCL administration's plans for UCL and what the volunteers of the Cheese Grater perceived to be a corporate-style policies, including a new identity for the college, which Mr Chatterbox alleged to have cost around £600,000.

In 2008, UCL Union passed a motion at the Annual General Meeting to ban the military from UCL. In response, The Cheese Grater published a Special Report which looked at the supposed democratic failings of the AGM. The magazine alleged that the motion to ban the military was null and void, making reference to a breach of the 1994 Education Act and to repeated procedural irregularities during the meeting. Once the issue was put online, The Cheese Grater website received over 900 hits in three days.

In February 2011, The Cheese Grater published documents from UCL Academic Board meetings which revealed the potential impact of government higher education cuts at UCL. The findings suggested a £35 million budget shortfall for UCL even if it were to charge the full £9,000 undergraduate tuition fee. Following the publication of this article, the documents revealing this were removed from the UCL website. The article was later picked up by Times Higher Education, who published a piece using the magazine's findings on 24 February 2011.

In March 2012, The Cheese Grater investigated UCL's bid to build a second London campus in Stratford, uncovering local residents' objections to the potential demolition of their homes and inadequacies in Newham Council's consultation process. The story was later picked up by The Guardian and other national news sources.

In 2017 the magazine covered UCL's cutting of ties with the Qatar Foundation, and in 2018, The Cheese Grater covered the UCU strike action, which affected UCL as well as many other London universities.

In 2021 the magazine launched an investigation into sexual harassment, intimidation, and bullying committed by UCL Security in Halls of Residence throughout the 2020–2021 academic year. The five month long investigation saw two of its writers uncover vast alleged abuses committed by UCL Security staff resulting in the publication of victims recollections of the alleged abuses. The article resulted in UCL launching an investigation, of which its findings have still not been published.

In 2022 the magazine published an article strongly criticising UCL's decision to cut ties with Stonewall, the article was widely received with both praise and criticism after it reached over 60,000 people on social media. The article exposed procedural inconsistencies, and lobbying by an established inter-departmental network of gender critical feminists amongst UCL's academic staff.

The UCL Graters
Members of the Cheese Grater Magazine Society founded the UCL Graters sketch comedy group in 2011. As the magazine was founded due to dissatisfaction with UCL's student media, so the UCL Graters were created due to dissatisfaction with UCL's student comedy scene. The group's cast changes yearly, tending to focus on darker and more absurd humour than UCL's Comedy Club and the MDs Comedy Revue. The group is run by the society's Show Coordinator, who directs the group in writing and performing their own material at shows in UCL and around London.

The Graters reached the semi-finals of the Leicester Square Theatre Sketch-Off in 2016, and were described as "exemplary" by the Wee Review for their 2017 Fringe show.

The Graters have performed at the Edinburgh Fringe Festival every year since their founding at various venues, including the Underbelly and Just the Tonic. The Fringe was cancelled in 2020 due to the COVID-19 pandemic, but the Graters returned to Edinburgh in 2021.

List of shows
Julian Ignores His Friends And Talks To A Pretty Girl (2012), a sketch show.
Crab Salad (2013), a sketch show.
Our Jackie (2014), a comedy play.
2015: A Sketch Odyssey (2015), a sketch show starring Ruby Clyde, Luke Reilly and Hûw Steer, produced by Will Orton.
UCL Graters: Immature Cheddar (2016), a sketch show starring Luke Reilly, Hûw Steer, Sarah King and Sam Pryce, produced by Will Orton and Freddie Lynch.
UCL Graters: Smashing (2017), a sketch show starring Hûw Steer, Heather Dempsey and Felicity Wareing, produced by Will Orton and Alex Diamond.
UCL Graters: Panopticon (2018), a thematic sketch show starring Joe Andreyev, Sam Dodgshon, Isobel MacLeod, Luke Shepherd and Felicity Wareing, produced by Alice Fraser-Edwards.
Clothesline (2019), a play-sketch hybrid about an unwashed pile of laundry. Starring Gassan Abdulrazek, Jake Bishop, Darcy Bounsall, Agnes Carrington-Windo, Sam Dodgshon and Jennie Howitt. Produced by Agnes Carrington-Windo, Sam Dodgshon and Alice Fraser Edwards.
Post Humour (2021), a play-sketch hybrid set in a surreal British Post Office. Starring Jennie Howitt, Rob Davidson, Anisa Khorassani, Sabrina Asrafova, Harris Morris, and Sam Dodgshon. Directed by Jennie Howitt and produced by Bori Papp. Winner of the Derek Spirit of the Fringe award.

Independence and censorship
Although UCL Union's Democracy and Communications sabbatical officer is The Cheese Graters so-called "legal publisher" (British libel law does not recognise such a title), the sabbatical officers traditionally pass issues of the magazine with few quibbles, thus allowing the magazine to remain as independent as possible.

This state of affairs was disrupted in October 2008 when an article in issue 18 was censored by Communications and Services Officer Charlie Clinton, leading the magazine to instead publish a story condemning his interference. The incident earned Clinton the nickname 'Hot Potato', due to a phrase he used when censoring the article.

Awards
The magazine won Best Student Publication at the UCL Union arts awards in May 2006, May 2007, May 2008, May 2009, June 2011 and June 2014. It was short listed for the award in 2010 and 2012 but lost out in the final stages. In November 2006, The Cheese Grater won Best Small Budget Publication at The Guardian Student Media Awards, and in November 2007 was nominated in the Best Magazine category. In June 2012, the society also won the UCL Union award for Best Garage Theatre Show for its inaugural comedy show, and in June 2014 was awarded the Diversity & Inclusion Award. In 2016, the society won the 'Most Improved Society' award, after the launch of its sister zine and the expansion of its sketch comedy arm.

In 2021, the UCL Graters' Fringe show, Post Humour, won the Derek Comedy Award for Spirit of the Fringe.

In 2022, The Cheese Grater Magazine was nominated and later awarded the best student publication in London by the Student Publication Association.

Structure
The constitution of the Magazine states the society must have three executive officers, the President, Treasurer, and Welfare Officer. The editorial structure of the publication consists of an Editor-In-Chief, an Investigations Editor, Online Editor, and Humour Editor. The magazine committee has also incorporated a Socials and Community Outreach Officer, Sketch Director, Sketch Producer, and Graphics Editor as it has expanded. The position of Zine Editor was created following the launch of the magazines sister publication.

All positions are elected through the Students Union of UCL. The elected positions form the committee.

Former Presidents and Editors-In-ChiefEditors-In-ChiefNandini Agarwal and Mel Benedichuk (2022–2023)
Alfie Pannell and Rusheen Bansal (2021–2022)
Sophia Robinson (2020–2021)
Suzy Kingston and Weronika Strzyzynska (2019–2020)
Ollie Dunn and Peter FitzSimons (2018–2019)
Jason Murugesu and Jack Redfern (2017–2018)
Ollie Phelan (September 2016 – August 2017)
Bo Franklin (September 2015 – August 2016)
Charlie Hayton (September 2014 – August 2015)
Hannah Sketchley (September 2013 – August 2014)
Will Rowland (September 2012 – August 2013)
Chon Böll (September 2011 – August 2012)
Thom Rhoades (September 2010 – August 2011)
A.Z. McKenna (September 2009 – August 2010)
Jenni Hulse (September 2008 – August 2009)
Hannah Hudson (January – August 2008)
Mark Ravinet (September 2006 – December 2007)
René Lavanchy (September 2004 – August 2006)President'''
Jamie Dorrington (2022–2023)
Maryam Badghisi (2021–2022)
Rob Davidson (2020–2021)

References

External links
The Cheese Grater Magazine website contains all the issues in PDF format.
 The UCL Graters'' YouTube channel.

British student media groups
Clubs and societies of University College London
Magazines established in 2004
Magazines published in London
Student magazines published in the United Kingdom